Judge Erskine may refer to:

Herbert Wilson Erskine (1888–1951), judge of the United States District Court for the Northern District of California
John Erskine (judge) (1813–1895), judge of the United States District Courts for the Northern and Southern Districts of Georgia